Rudziniec  is a village in Gliwice County, Silesian Voivodeship, in southern Poland. It is the seat of the gmina (administrative district) called Gmina Rudziniec.

The village has a population of 1,633.

History
The village was mentioned in documents in 1305, when it was part of fragmented Piast-ruled Poland. Later on, it was also part of Bohemia (Czechia), Prussia, and Germany. In 1936, during a massive Nazi campaign of renaming of placenames, the village was renamed to Rudgershagen to erase traces of Polish origin. During World War II, the Germans operated the E332 and E389 forced labour subcamps of the Stalag VIII-B/344 prisoner-of-war camp in the village. After the defeat of Germany in the war, in 1945, the village became again part of Poland and its historic name was restored.

Transport
There is a train station in the village.

Gallery

References

Villages in Gliwice County